Citharomangelia is a genus of small predatory sea snails, marine gastropod mollusks in the family Mangeliidae.

Species
Species within the genus Citharomangelia include:
 Citharomangelia africana (G. B. Sowerby III, 1903)
 Citharomangelia bianca Bozzetti, 2018
 Citharomangelia bicinctula (Nevill & Nevill, 1871)
 Citharomangelia boakei (Nevill & Nevill, 1869)
 Citharomangelia denticulata (E. A. Smith, 1884)
 Citharomangelia elevata (E. A. Smith, 1884)
 Citharomangelia galigensis (Melvill, 1899)
 Citharomangelia pellucida (Reeve, 1846)
 Citharomangelia planilabroides (Tryon, 1884)
 Citharomangelia quadrilineata (G. B. Sowerby III, 1913)
 Citharomangelia richardi (Crosse, 1869)
 Citharomangelia townsendi (G. B. Sowerby III, 1895)
Species brought into synonymy
 Citharomangelia bicinctula (G. Nevill & H. Nevill, 1871): synonym of Citharomangelia boakei (G. Nevill & H. Nevill, 1869)

References

 Kilburn R.N. 1992. Turridae (Mollusca: Gastropoda) of southern Africa and Mozambique. Part 6. Subfamily Mangeliinae, section 1. Annals of the Natal Museum, 33: 461–575

External links
  Tucker, J.K. 2004 Catalog of recent and fossil turrids (Mollusca: Gastropoda). Zootaxa 682:1-1295.
 Worldwide Mollusc Species Data Base: Mangeliidae